Confluent and reticulated papillomatosis of Gougerot and Carteaud is an uncommon but distinctive acquired ichthyosiform dermatosis characterized by persistent dark, scaly, papules and plaques that tend to be localized predominantly on the central trunk.

Eponym
Henri Gougerot and Alexandre Carteaud originally described the condition in 1927. The cause remains unknown, but the observation that the condition may clear with Minocycline turned attention to an infectious agent. Actinomycete Dietzia strain X was isolated from one individual. Other antibiotics found useful include azithromycin, fusidic acid, clarithromycin, erythromycin, tetracycline, and cefdinir.

See also
 Ichthyosis
 Acquired ichthyosis
 List of cutaneous conditions

References

External links 

Lymphoid-related cutaneous conditions
Genodermatoses
Rare diseases
Papulosquamous hyperkeratotic cutaneous conditions